Pabaneswara Shiva temple is situated in Bhubaneswar, Orissa, India, at a distance of 100.00 metres east of Parashurameshvara Temple on the left side of the road leading to Kedara Gauri temple. The temple has a vimana with a renovated porch, facing towards east. The presiding deity is a Shiva linga within a circular yonipitha inside the sanctum. It is a living temple. The temple is surrounded by private residential buildings and market complex on three sides and the road on the south. The temple was rebuilt or renovated sometimes back as it appears from the second phase of building from above the pabhaga.

Name 
Present Name: Pabanesvara Siva temple

Past Name:Daitesvara Siva temple

Location
Lat. 200 14’ 59" N, Long. 850 50’ 34" E Elev. 53 ft

Ownership 
i) Single/ Multiple: Multiple
ii) Public/ Private: Public
iii) other: Local people look
after the temple.

Age 
i) Precise date: unknown
ii) Approximate date: 10th century A.D.
iii) Source of Information: Architectural features

Property Type 
i) Precinct/ Building/ Structure/Landscape/Site/Tank: Building

ii) Subtype: Temple

iii) Typology: Rekha deul

Property use 
i) Abandoned/ in use: In use

ii) Present use: Worshipped

iii) Significance

i) Historic significance: — unknown

ii) Cultural significance: Various rituals like Sivaratri, Sankranti, and Kartika
Purnima are celebrated.

iii) Social significance: — unknown

iv) Associational significance: — unknown

Physical description
Surrounding: The temple is surrounded by private residential buildings and market complex on east, west and north and the road on the south.

Orientation:Facing towards east.

Architectural features (Plan and Elevation): The entire temple is a renovated one. On plan, the temple has a vimana with a renovated frontal porch measuring 3.80 in length and 0.75 in breadth. The temple stands on a low platform which is now buried. The vimana is ancharatha on plan as distinguished by a central raha a pair of anuratha pagas and kanika agas on the either side of the raha. n elevation, the temple has a trianga bada measuring 2.90 metres in height. Pabhaga measuring 0.75 metres has four moulding of khura, kumbha, pata, and basanta. The jangha hat measures 1.65 metres is plain and the baranda is 0.50 metres. The temple is devoid of any culptural embellishment. The mastaka of the temple conforms to the typical Kalingan style hat consists of beki, amlaka, khapuri and kalasa.
Raha niche & parsva devatas: The raha niches on three sides uniformly measures 0.80 metres in height x 0.45 metres in width x 0.25 metres in depth, are all empty.

Decorative features 
Doorjambs: The doorjambs are decorated with a single vertical band of scroll work. At the lalatabimba there is a Gajalaxmi seated in lalitasana on a full blown lotus. At the base of the right doorjamb there is a dvarapala nich crowned by a stylized chaitya motif. The niche accommodates a saivite dvarapala that holds a trident. The left jamb is a piece of renovated stone which is plain. Beneath the chandrasila there are bharabahakas. Above the door there is a graha architrave carved with the traditional
navagrahas seated in padmasana. Ketu is with a serpent tail and upraised hands.

Building material 
Grey sandstone.

Construction techniques 
Dry masonry

Style 
Kalingan

State of preservation 
i) Good/Fair/ Showing Signs of Deterioration/Advanced: The superstructure has developed cracks from all the sides and partly damaged in the southern and western sides.

ii) State of Decay/Danger of Disappearance: — Unknown

Condition description 
i) Signs of distress: The superstructure has developed cracks from all side
which needs repair.

ii) Structural problems: — unknown

iii) Repairs and Maintenance: It was renovated by State Archaeology under X and XI
Finance Commission Award.

Grade (A/B/C) 
i) Architecture: B

ii) Historic: C

iii) Associational: C

iv) Social/Cultural: C

See also
 List of temples in Bhubaneswar

References 
Lesser Known Monuments of Bhubaneswar by Dr. Sadasiba Pradhan

https://web.archive.org/web/20160303233701/http://www.niuzer.com/India/Heritage-structure-lies-in-sorry-state-4630291.html

Shiva temples
Hindu temples in Bhubaneswar
10th-century Hindu temples